The Price You Pay is the fifth studio album by Spear of Destiny, released by Virgin Records in 1988 (see 1988 in music).

Track listing
All songs written by Kirk Brandon

 "So In Love With You" - 4:22
 "Tinseltown" - 5:15
 "The Price" - 5:11
 "I Remember" - 5:50
 "Dreamtime" - 4:06
 "Radio Radio" - 3:09
 "If The Guns" - 4:10
 "View from a Tree" - 3:40
 "Junkman" - 5:10
 "Soldier Soldier" - 2:48
 "Brave New World" - 4:55

Personnel
Spear of Destiny
Kirk Brandon - vocals, guitar
Pete Barnacle - drums
Volker Janssen - keyboards
Chris Bostock - bass
Alan St. Clair - guitar
Technical
Justin Niebank - engineer
Anton Corbijn - photography
"Special thanks to: Nancy Brandon, Bunter, Sharkey, Steve Lewis, Rock'n' Roll Hampster, Danny and Richard (L.A.), And of course T.Razor (back cover)"

References
The Price You Pay - Virgin Records V 2549 (1988)
The Price You Pay - Virgin Records TCV 2549 (1988)
The Price You Pay - Virgin Records CDV 2549 (1988)

1988 albums
Virgin Records albums
Spear of Destiny (band) albums
Albums produced by Alan Shacklock